Bordentown Township is a township in Burlington County, in the U.S. state of New Jersey. As of the 2020 United States census, the township's population was 11,791, an increase of 424 (+3.7%) from the 2010 census count of 11,367, which in turn reflected an increase of 2,987 (+35.6%) from the 8,380 counted in the 2000 census.

Bordentown was incorporated as a township by an act of the New Jersey Legislature on March 8, 1852, from portions of Chesterfield Township and Mansfield Township, based on the results of a referendum held that same day. Bordentown city separated from the township in 1877 and Fieldsboro became fully independent in 1894 The township was named for founder Joseph Borden.

Geography
According to the United States Census Bureau, the township had a total area of 9.28 square miles (24.02 km2), including 8.66 square miles (22.44 km2) of land and 0.61 square miles (1.58 km2) of water (6.59%).

The township borders Bordentown City, Chesterfield Township, Fieldsboro, Florence Township and Mansfield Township in Burlington County; Hamilton Township in Mercer County; and Falls Township across the Delaware River in Pennsylvania.

Crosswicks Creek and its juncture with the Delaware River, otherwise known as the Trenton-Hamilton Marsh, is a significant ecosystem and, with the peninsula of land and waterways to the northwest of Bordentown Township known, respectively, as Duck Island, Duck Creek and the Delaware and Raritan Canal, it is protected by the State of New Jersey as the Duck Island Recreation Area.

Unincorporated communities, localities and place names located partially or completely within the township include Bossert Estates, Dunns Mill and Newbold Island.

The former  Parklands dump brownfield site is being transformed to a solar array by PSE&G as part of a project that began in 2014.

Demographics

2010 census

The Census Bureau's 2006–2010 American Community Survey showed that (in 2010 inflation-adjusted dollars) median household income was $80,860 (with a margin of error of +/− $4,727) and the median family income was $97,346 (+/− $8,031). Males had a median income of $60,690 (+/− $3,155) versus $52,076 (+/− $4,827) for females. The per capita income for the borough was $35,276 (+/− $1,638). About 1.7% of families and 1.8% of the population were below the poverty line, including 3.2% of those under age 18 and 1.7% of those age 65 or over.

2000 census
As of the 2000 United States census there were 8,380 people, 3,293 households, and 2,305 families residing in the township. The racial makeup of the township was 89.33% White, 5.02% African American, 0.20% Native American, 3.32% Asian, 0.68% from other races, and 1.44% from two or more races. Hispanic or Latino of any race were 3.03% of the population.

There were 3,293 households, out of which 32.6% had children under the age of 18 living with them, 56.5% were married couples living together, 9.8% had a female householder with no husband present, and 30.0% were non-families. 23.5% of all households were made up of individuals, and 7.4% had someone living alone who was 65 years of age or older.  The average household size was 2.53 and the average family size was 3.03.

In the township the population was spread out, with 23.7% under the age of 18, 6.3% from 18 to 24, 34.6% from 25 to 44, 23.8% from 45 to 64, and 11.7% who were 65 years of age or older. The median age was 38 years. For every 100 females, there were 94.9 males.  For every 100 females age 18 and over, there were 90.9 males.

The median income for a household in the township was $60,131, and the median income for a family was $71,627. Males had a median income of $45,604 versus $35,115 for females. The per capita income for the township was $26,934.  About 2.0% of families and 2.8% of the population were below the poverty line, including 2.2% of those under age 18 and 5.3% of those age 65 or over.

The most common ancestries in Bordentown Township were Italian (25.7%), Irish (23.8%), German (20.0%), English (11.8%) and Polish (9.8%).

Government

Local government

Bordentown Township is governed under the Township form of New Jersey municipal government, one of 141 municipalities (of the 564) statewide that use this form, the second-most commonly used form of government in the state. The Township Committee is comprised of five members, who are elected directly by the voters at-large in partisan elections to serve three-year terms of office on a staggered basis, with either one or two seats coming up for election each year as part of the November general election in a three-year cycle. At an annual reorganization meeting, the Township Committee selects one of its members to serve as Mayor and another as Deputy Mayor.

, members of the Bordentown Township Committee are Mayor Stephen Benowitz (D, term on committee ends December 31, 2024; term as mayor ends 2022), Deputy Mayor Eugene M. Fuzy (D, term on committee and as deputy mayor ends 2022), Eric Holliday (D, 2024), James H. Kostoplis (D, 2023) and Aneka A. Miller (D, 2023).

John Moynihan was selected in July 2012 from a list of three candidates nominated by the Republican municipal committee to fill the seat vacated by Anita DiMattia after she left office the previous month.

Federal, state and county representation 
Bordentown Township is located in the 3rd Congressional District and is part of New Jersey's 7th state legislative district. Prior to the 2011 reapportionment following the 2010 Census, Bordentown Township had been in the 30th state legislative district.

 

Burlington County is governed by a Board of County Commissioners comprised of five members who are chosen at-large in partisan elections to serve three-year terms of office on a staggered basis, with either one or two seats coming up for election each year; at an annual reorganization meeting, the board selects a director and deputy director from among its members to serve a one-year term. , Burlington County's Commissioners are
Director Felicia Hopson (D, Willingboro Township, term as commissioner ends December 31, 2024; term as director ends 2023),
Deputy Director Tom Pullion (D, Edgewater Park, term as commissioner and as deputy director ends 2023),
Allison Eckel (D, Medford, 2025),
Daniel J. O'Connell (D, Delran Township, 2024) and 
Balvir Singh (D, Burlington Township, 2023). 
Burlington County's Constitutional Officers are
County Clerk Joanne Schwartz (R, Southampton Township, 2023)
Sheriff James H. Kostoplis (D, Bordentown, 2025) and 
Surrogate Brian J. Carlin (D, Burlington Township, 2026).

Politics
As of March 2011, there were a total of 6,378 registered voters in Bordentown Township, of which 1,793 (28.1% vs. 33.3% countywide) were registered as Democrats, 1,263 (19.8% vs. 23.9%) were registered as Republicans and 3,321 (52.1% vs. 42.8%) were registered as Unaffiliated. There was one voter registered to another party. Among the township's 2010 Census population, 56.1% (vs. 61.7% in Burlington County) were registered to vote, including 75.8% of those ages 18 and over (vs. 80.3% countywide).

In the 2012 presidential election, Democrat Barack Obama received 2,949 votes (57.8% vs. 58.1% countywide), ahead of Republican Mitt Romney with 2,034 votes (39.9% vs. 40.2%) and other candidates with 74 votes (1.5% vs. 1.0%), among the 5,102 ballots cast by the township's 6,794 registered voters, for a turnout of 75.1% (vs. 74.5% in Burlington County). In the 2008 presidential election, Democrat Barack Obama received 2,812 votes (54.7% vs. 58.4% countywide), ahead of Republican John McCain with 2,232 votes (43.4% vs. 39.9%) and other candidates with 62 votes (1.2% vs. 1.0%), among the 5,144 ballots cast by the township's 6,374 registered voters, for a turnout of 80.7% (vs. 80.0% in Burlington County). In the 2004 presidential election, Democrat John Kerry received 2,320 votes (49.4% vs. 52.9% countywide), ahead of Republican George W. Bush with 2,305 votes (49.1% vs. 46.0%) and other candidates with 33 votes (0.7% vs. 0.8%), among the 4,694 ballots cast by the township's 5,903 registered voters, for a turnout of 79.5% (vs. 78.8% in the whole county).

In the 2013 gubernatorial election, Republican Chris Christie received 2,029 votes (60.9% vs. 61.4% countywide), ahead of Democrat Barbara Buono with 1,194 votes (35.9% vs. 35.8%) and other candidates with 53 votes (1.6% vs. 1.2%), among the 3,330 ballots cast by the township's 6,840 registered voters, yielding a 48.7% turnout (vs. 44.5% in the county). In the 2009 gubernatorial election, Republican Chris Christie received 1,733 votes (49.1% vs. 47.7% countywide), ahead of Democrat Jon Corzine with 1,464 votes (41.5% vs. 44.5%), Independent Chris Daggett with 182 votes (5.2% vs. 4.8%) and other candidates with 113 votes (3.2% vs. 1.2%), among the 3,530 ballots cast by the township's 6,435 registered voters, yielding a 54.9% turnout (vs. 44.9% in the county).

Education 
Public school students in pre-kindergarten through twelfth grade attend the schools of the Bordentown Regional School District, which serves students from Bordentown City, Bordentown Township and Fieldsboro Borough. As of the 2020–21 school year, the district, comprised of five schools, had an enrollment of 2,373 students and 194.0 classroom teachers (on an FTE basis), for a student–teacher ratio of 12.2:1. Schools in the district (with 2020–21 enrollment data from the National Center for Education Statistics) are 
Clara Barton Elementary School with 235 students in grades K–2 (generally serves Bordentown City and the Holloway Meadows section of Bordentown Township), 
Peter Muschal Elementary School with 522 students in grades Pre-K–5 (generally serves remainder of Bordentown Township and the Borough of Fieldsboro), 
MacFarland Intermediate School with 243 students in grades 3–5, 
Bordentown Regional Middle School with 576 students in grades 6–8 and 
Bordentown Regional High School with 766 students in grades 9–12.  The district's board of education is comprised of nine members, who are elected directly by voters to serve three-year terms of office on a staggered basis, with three seats up for election each year. The board's nine seats are allocated based on the population of the constituent municipalities, with five seats assigned to Bordentown Township.

The New Hanover Township School District, consisting of New Hanover Township (including its Cookstown area) and Wrightstown Borough, sends students to Bordentown Regional High School on a tuition basis for ninth through twelfth grades as part of a sending/receiving relationship that has been in place since the 1960s, with about 50 students from the New Hanover district being sent to the high school. As of 2011, the New Hanover district was considering expansion of its relationship to send students to Bordentown for middle school for grades 6–8.

Students from Bordentown Township, and from all of Burlington County, are eligible to attend the Burlington County Institute of Technology, a countywide public school district that serves the vocational and technical education needs of students at the high school and post-secondary level at its campuses in Medford and Westampton Township.

Transportation

Roads and highways

Interstate 95 and Interstate 295 are the two limited-access highways traversing the township. Interstate 295 follows a similar alignment to the northwest of I-95, extending from Mansfield Township on the southwest to Hamilton Township in the north.

U.S. Route 130 and U.S. Route 206 are the primary surface highways traversing the township. US 206 has an interchange with I-95 (NJ Turnpike Exit 7), while US 130 has an interchange with I-295 (Exit 57). The two U.S. Highways also share a brief concurrency within the township boundaries where they intersect.

Public transportation
NJ Transit offers light rail service at the Bordentown station at Park Street on the River Line between the Trenton Rail Station and the Walter Rand Transportation Center (and other stops) in Camden.

NJ Transit provides bus service in the township between Trenton and Philadelphia on the 409 route.

Notable people

People who were born in, residents of, or otherwise closely associated with Bordentown Township include:

 Andy Kim (born 1982), politician and former diplomat serving as the U.S. representative from New Jersey's 3rd congressional district
 Julia Reichert (1946–2022), Academy Award-winning documentary filmmaker, activist, and feminist

References

External links

Bordentown Township website

 
1852 establishments in New Jersey
Populated places established in 1852
Township form of New Jersey government
Townships in Burlington County, New Jersey
New Jersey populated places on the Delaware River